Limbo, Panto is the debut studio album by British art rock band Wild Beasts. It was released on 16 June 2008 by Domino Records, followed by the single for "The Devil's Crayon" on 30 June and "Brave Bulging Buoyant Clairvoyants" on 16 October. The album was well received by critics.

Track listing
 "Vigil for a Fuddy Duddy" – 4:43
 "The Club of Fathomless Love" – 3:44
 "The Devil's Crayon" – 3:38
 "Woebegone Wanderers" – 4:53
 "The Old Dog" – 4:27
 "Please, Sir" – 3:27
 "His Grinning Skull" – 4:36
 "She Purred, While I Grrred" – 3:30 
 "Brave Bulging Buoyant Clairvoyants" – 4:02
 "Cheerio Chaps, Cheerio Goodbye" – 4:38

Personnel 
 Hayden Thorpe – vocals, guitar, piano
 Ben Little - guitar
 Tom Fleming – vocals, bass guitar
 Chris Talbot – drums, backing vocals
 Tore Johannson – production
 Jens Lindgard – engineering (GULA Studion, Malmö)
 Karl-Axel Bengtsson – engineering on tracks 1, 2, 3 & 9 (Varispeed, Malmö)
 S Rooke – mastering (Abbey Road Studios, London)
 Nick Scott – artwork

References 

Wild Beasts albums
2008 debut albums
Domino Recording Company albums
Albums produced by Tore Johansson